George Tyson is a rugby league footballer who plays as a  or  for Swinton in the Betfred Championship.

He has previously played for Salford, Sheffield Eagles and Oldham (Heritage № 1333). He plays at loose forward or centre.

References

External links
Swinton Lions profile
Oldham Rougyeds profile

1993 births
Living people
English rugby league players
Oldham R.L.F.C. players
Rugby league locks
Salford Red Devils players
Sheffield Eagles players
Swinton Lions players